Eve Miller (born Marilyn Miller; August 8, 1923 – August 17, 1973) was an American actress who appeared in 41 films between 1945 and 1961. She was born in Los Angeles, California, and died in Van Nuys, California. She died by suicide at age 50.

Early life
Born in Los Angeles, California, Miller was the daughter of Mr. and Mrs. Robert Stanley Miller and was raised in San Francisco, where her father was a piano salesman.

During the early years of World War II, Miller worked as a welder in a shipyard. However, before the war ended she had taken a job as a department store clerk, and later as a showgirl, eventually playing at the San Francisco production of The Folies Bergère of 1944. This led to her first role as a showgirl in 1945's Diamond Horseshoe.

Movie career

In 1951, after several small parts in television and movies such as The Vicious Years (1950), Miller came to the attention of producer-director Ida Lupino and through her influence was cast in Warner Brothers' The Big Trees, starring opposite Kirk Douglas. Several more parts followed such as The Winning Team with Ronald Reagan and Kansas Pacific starring Sterling Hayden. Miller's main work though came in a long string of television roles stretching through the 1950s.

She appeared regularly in anthologies such as Fireside Theater, Four Star Playhouse, and Crossroads. The actress also had parts in a number of series including Lassie, Annie Oakley, and Richard Diamond, Private Detective. However, Miller never achieved a regular role in a TV series. Miller's final appearance was a 1961 role in the crime drama, Coronado 9.

Personal life
A Democrat, she supported the campaign of Adlai Stevenson during the 1952 presidential election.

In 1954, Miller met Glase Lohman, an actor who had a brief television and movie career in the mid-1950s, and they became engaged. On July 21, 1955, after an argument between the two, Miller attempted suicide by stabbing herself in the abdomen. According to newspapers at the time, she was discovered by police on her kitchen floor, surrounded by letters she had written to Lohman. Eventually, after four hours of surgery, she recovered.

On August 17, 1973, nine days after her 50th birthday, Miller died by suicide in Van Nuys, California. She was interred in Forest Lawn Cemetery (Hollywood Hills).

Filmography

Film
 Diamond Horseshoe (1945) - Chorine (uncredited)
 I Wonder Who's Kissing Her Now (1947) - Anita (uncredited)
 Buckaroo from Powder River (1947) - Molly Parnell
 Inner Sanctum (1948) - Marie Kembar
 Beyond the Forest (1949) - Switchboard Operator (uncredited)
 Arctic Fury (1949) - Martha Barlow
 Never Fear (1950) - Phyllis Townsend
 Mrs. O'Malley and Mr. Malone (1950) - Nurse on Train (uncredited)
 The Vicious Years (1950) - Giulia
 Pier 23 (1951) - Norma Harmon
 The Big Trees (1952) - Alicia Chadwick
 The Winning Team (1952) - Margaret Killefer
 She's Working Her Way Through College (1952) - Copeland's Secretary (uncredited)
 The Story of Will Rogers (1952) - Cora Marshall
 April in Paris (1952) - Marcia Sherman
 Kansas Pacific (1953) - Barbara Bruce
 The Desperate Women (1954) - Woman
 There's No Business Like Show Business (1954) - Hatcheck Girl
 The Big Bluff (1955) - Marsha Jordan
 Artists and Models (1955) - (uncredited)
 Broadway Jungle (1955)

Television
 Your Show Time (1949)
 The Range Rider (1951) - Ruth Wilson / Amy
 Fireside Theatre (1953) - Laura Chadson / Millie / Poetess / Mary
 Mayor of the Town (1954) - Marion Lane
 Annie Oakley (1954-1957) - Kathy Stokes / Laura Stevens / Jane Lester
 The Lineup (1954-1959) - Jane Carstairs / Mrs. Patterson
 The Whistler (1955) - Edith
 City Detective (1955) - Katherine
 Crossroads (1955-1957) - Helen Chamberlain / Mrs. Withersp
 Navy Log  (1957) - Lois MacKenzie
 Mr. Adams and Eve (1957) - Begum (Episode: "International Affair")
 Perry Mason (1958) - Nora Kelly
 Frontier Doctor (1959) - Paula Mason

References

External links

 
 New York Times account of Miller's 1955 suicide attempt, nytimes.com 

1923 births
1973 deaths
Suicides in California
American film actresses
American television actresses
20th-century American actresses
California Democrats
Burials at Forest Lawn Memorial Park (Hollywood Hills)
1973 suicides
Female suicides